Castelluccio is a village in Umbria, in the Apennine Mountains of central Italy. Administratively, it is a frazione of the ca. 28 km distant town Norcia. According to the 2001 census, it had close to 150 inhabitants.

Geography
The village lies at 1452 m, making it the highest settlement in the Apennines. It lies above the "Great Plain" (Piano Grande - 1270 m), next to the Monti Sibillini National Park.

Rain and meltwater accumulate on the surface of the plain, which is made of largely impermeable sediments. The greenish ditches drain the water towards openings called ponors, which are part of the karstic underground drainage system. If the karst drainage is blocked for any reason, water backs up and turns the plain into a temporary lake.

History
The village dates from the 13th century or slightly earlier, but the area had previously been settled by the Romans.

In 2016 and 2017 Central Italy seismic events hit Castelluccio hard, destroying roughly 60% of the town, forcing the evacuation of all inhabitants and the total closure of all road and/or offroad access. Certain roads were scheduled for partial reopening in July 2017. As of 2018, the village can be reached again, and temporary buildings have been erected housing bars and shops.

Economy
The fields on the slopes below the village are cultivated; the town is known for its excellent lentils. In springtime the nature of the fields is in lavish color, with red poppies and yellow rapeseed. The plains grassland is ideal for sheep husbandry. There is a lot of ski- and trekking tourism.

Notes and references

External links 

 Lentils and Foraging in Castelluccio
 Photo gallery made by a UNESCO photographer
 

Via SSH

Frazioni of the Province of Perugia
Hilltowns in Umbria
Apennine Mountains
Norcia